Sardkhaneh-ye Baradaran Padram (also Romanized as Sardkhāneh-ye Barādarān Padrām) is a village in Deris Rural District, in the Central District of Kazerun County, Fars Province, Iran. At the 2006 census, its population was 18, in 5 families.

References 

Populated places in Kazerun County